Jaroslav Průcha (24 April 1898 – 25 April 1963) was a Czechoslovakian film actor. He appeared in more than 50 films between 1929 and 1963. He is buried at the Vyšehrad Cemetery.

Selected filmography

 Paradise Road (1936)
 Skeleton on Horseback (1937)
 The World Is Ours (1937)
 Virginity (1937)
 Škola základ života (1938)
 Muž z neznáma (1939)
 Cesta do hlubin študákovy duše (1939)
 Humoreska (1939)
 Pacientka Dr. Hegla (1940)
 Jan Cimbura (1941)
 Barbora Hlavsová (1942)
 The Great Dam (1942)
 Mist on the Moors (1943)
 Černí myslivci (1945)
 Capek's Tales (1947)
 Krakatit (1948)
 Silent Barricade (1949)
 Nástup (1953)
 Dog's Heads (1955)

References

External links
 

1898 births
1963 deaths
Actors from Plzeň
People from the Kingdom of Bohemia
Czech male film actors
Czech male stage actors
Czech theatre directors
Burials at Vyšehrad Cemetery